Aldo-keto reductase family 1, member B1 (AKR1B1), also known as aldose reductase, is an enzyme that is encoded by the AKR1B1 gene in humans. It is a reduced nicotinamide-adenine dinucleotide phosphate (NADPH)-dependent enzyme catalyzing the reduction of various aldehydes and ketones to the corresponding alcohol. The involvement of AKR1B1 in oxidative stress diseases, cell signal transduction, and cell proliferation process endows AKR1B1 with potential as a therapeutic target.

Structure

Gene 
The AKR1B1 gene lies on the chromosome location of 7q33 and consists of 10 exons. There are a few putative pseudogenes for this gene, and one of them has been confirmed and mapped to chromosome 3.

Protein 
AKR1B1 consists of 316 amino acid residues and weighs 35853Da. It does not possess the traditional dinucleotide binding fold. The way it binds NADPH differs from other nucleotide adenine dinucleotide-dependent enzymes. The active site pocket of human aldose reductase is relatively hydrophobic, lined by seven aromatic and four other non-polar residues.

Function 

AR belongs to the aldehyde-keto reductase superfamily, with a widely expression in human organs including the kidney, lens, retina, nerve, heart, placenta, brain, skeletal muscle, testis, blood vessels, lung, and liver.  It is a reduced nicotinamide-adenine dinucleotide phosphate (NADPH)-dependent enzyme catalyzing the reduction of various aldehydes and ketones to the corresponding alcohol. It also participates in glucose metabolism and osmoregulation and plays a protective role against toxic aldehydes derived from lipid peroxidation and steroidogenesis.

Clinical significance 

Under diabetic conditions AR converts glucose into sorbitol, which is then converted to fructose. 20466987 It has been found to play an important role in many diabetes complications such as diabetes retinopathy and renopathy. It is also involved in many oxidative stress diseases, cell signal transduction, and cell proliferation process including cardiovascular disorders, sepsis, and cancer.

It has been reported that the action of AR contributes to the activation of retinal microglia, suggesting that inhibition of AR may be of a therapeutic importance to reduce inflammation associated with activation of RMG. Adapting AR inhibitors could as well prevent sepsis complications, prevent angiogenesis, ameliorate mild or asymptomatic diabetic cardiovascular autonomic neuropathy and may be a promising strategy for the treatment of endotoxemia and other ROS-induced inflammatory diseases.

Interactions 

AKR1B1 has been found to interact with:

ginsenoside 20(S)-Rh2
alkaloid
carboxylic acid derivatives
spirohydantoins
cyclic amides

References

Further reading

External links 
 
 

EC 1.1.1